Katib al-Wilaya Mosque or Welayat Mosque is a small historic mosque located along Omar Mukhtar Street in Gaza City in the Zaytun Quarter of the Old City. The mosque was built by the Burji Mamluks in 1432, however, the structure could date further back to 1344. Additions to the western part of the mosque were commissioned in 1584 by Ahmed Bey, the Ottoman clerk of the Damascus Vilayet (Province of Damascus). Damascus Vilayet's Arabic transliteration is Wilayat Dimashq, hence the name of the mosque Katib al-Wilaya ("the clerk of the state").

Architecture
The main body of the mosque is its prayer hall, which is rectangular in shape and dates to the Mamluk period. The entrance is located at the qibla (indicator of direction towards Mecca) wall.

Minaret
The minaret of the mosque, rising above the mosque's eastern wall, is adjacent to the bell tower of the St. Porphyrius Church. Palestinian historian Aref al-Aref says local legend attributes this positioning of the building to the Rashidun caliph Umar ibn al-Khattab's orders to the Muslim general Amr ibn al-'As to build a mosque next to every church in the lands conquered by the Muslims. Another anecdote claims the mosque had earlier been a monastery known as Deir Salm al-Fada'il. Both of these accounts lack any verifiable basis other than local folklore.

In 1432, the minaret was restored by Sayf ad-Din Inal, the Burji mamluk who later became sultan in 1453.

References

Further reading

 
 

15th-century mosques
Mamluk architecture in the State of Palestine
Mosques in Gaza City
Mosques completed in 1584
Mosques completed in 1432